Lily Chan, a Chinese singer in Hong Kong. She was born and grew up in Guangzhou. Chan's musical talent was discovered by her choir teacher. By age 10, Chan started recording in the studio and has won numerous singing awards including Champion of the National Children's New Song Competition, the gold prize for solo song in the Guangzhhou Children's Art Flower Show etc.

By age 16, she gave performances on an international tour in Beijing, Hong Kong, Macau, and Malaysia. Since making her debut when she was just 19, she has already released ten albums, which were consistently ranked among the top 10 Hi-Fi albums of the year in Hong Kong. Her on-stage elegance and her sweet, mellow voice earned her the nickname Queen of Hi-Fi.

Discography
 Purely (CD) – 2012
 Yan Lei (CD) – 2011
 Lily Sings Teresa Live in Hong Kong (CD) – 2010
 Passion 2009 Live (CD) - 2010
 Nong Qing (CD) – 2009
 Lily Chan Hong Kong Concert Live 2007 (CD/VCD/DVD) – 2008
 The Sky And The Earth (CD) – 2007
 Lily Come Face To Face With Chris (CD) – 2006
 Sweet Words (CD) – 2005
 1.825m (CD) – 2005
 The Beautiful Shade Of Flowers (CD) – 2004
 Song Of Love (CD) – 2004
 Each In A Different Corner Of The World - 2003
 Xin Qu (CD) - 2002

Concert
 Passion – 2009
 Lily Chan Hong Kong Concert Live - 2007

References

Cantopop singers
1983 births
Living people
People from Foshan
Singers from Guangdong
21st-century Chinese women singers